Psilopa is a genus of flies. The Petroleum fly, formerly P. petrolei, which is the only known insect to develop in naturally occurring crude oil, was transferred to genus Helaeomyia.

Species
 Psilopa aeneonigra
 Psilopa aequalipes
 Psilopa aethiopiae
 Psilopa africana
 Psilopa angola
 Psilopa antennata
 Psilopa apicalis
 Psilopa atlantica
 Psilopa bornholmi
 Psilopa clara
 Psilopa composita
 Psilopa compta
 Psilopa confentei
 Psilopa desmata
 Psilopa dupla
 Psilopa elsa
 Psilopa fannya
 Psilopa fisseli
 Psilopa flavescens
 Psilopa flaviantennalis
 Psilopa flavida
 Psilopa flavimanus
 Psilopa fratella
 Psilopa gigantea
 Psilopa girschneri
 Psilopa gracilis
 Psilopa grisescens
 Psilopa iceryae
 Psilopa insolita
 Psilopa irregularis
 Psilopa leucostoma (Meigen, 1830)
 Psilopa loewi
 Psilopa mackiei
 Psilopa marginella
 Psilopa martima
 Psilopa meneghinii
 Psilopa mentita
 Psilopa metallica
 Psilopa nana
 Psilopa nervimaculata
 Psilopa nigricornis
 Psilopa nigrifacies
 Psilopa nigrina
 Psilopa nigritella
 Psilopa nigrithorax
 Psilopa nilotica
 Psilopa nitidifacies
 Psilopa nitidissima
 Psilopa nitidula Fallen, 1823
 Psilopa obscuripes
 Psilopa ovaliformis
 Psilopa pappi
 Psilopa pectinata
 Psilopa polita
 Psilopa pulchripes
 Psilopa pulicaria
 Psilopa punica
 Psilopa quadratula
 Psilopa radiolata
 Psilopa roederi
 Psilopa rufibasis
 Psilopa rufipes
 Psilopa rufithorax
 Psilopa rutilans
 Psilopa senegalensis
 Psilopa sinensis
 Psilopa singaporensis
 Psilopa thora
 Psilopa tonsa
 Psilopa urbana
 Psilopa victoria
 Psilopa violacea

References

 Calagogue of Life 2008

Ephydridae
Diptera of Europe
Brachycera genera
Taxa named by Carl Fredrik Fallén
Articles containing video clips